France–Mauritius (or Franco-Mauritian relations) are the historical, political, economic, social and cultural connections between the Republic of France and the Republic of Mauritius. Mauritius also shares close ties with its nearest neighbour, the French island of Réunion. Connections between France and Mauritius date back to 1710 when Mauritius became a French colony and was renamed Isle de France. The only dispute between the two countries is the sovereignty of Tromelin; the island is claimed by Mauritius. The French embassy is located at Port Louis, while Mauritius has an embassy in Paris.

Trade
The trade relations between Mauritius and France are strong, multi-layered and have grown over the years. France is one Mauritius's strategic partners; it is by far the most important market for the Mauritian tourism industry.

See also

 France–Africa relations
 Franco-Mauritian
 Mauritians in France
 Mauritians
 Foreign relations of France
 Foreign relations of Mauritius

References

External links
 French Embassy in Mauritius
 Mauritius Embassy in France

 
Bilateral relations of Mauritius
Mauritius
Relations of colonizer and former colony